The Nakamurella is a genus of bacteria.

Phylogeny
The currently accepted phylogeny is based on 16S rRNA-based LTP release 123 by The All-Species Living Tree Project

References

Actinomycetota
Bacteria genera